Dansungsa, established in 1907, was the first movie theatre in Korea. It is located in Jongno 3-ga, Seoul. Korea Loyal Flight became the theatre's first ever premiere in 1919. Chunsa Na Woon-gyu's Korean folk movie, Arirang, followed, premiering in the theatre in 1926. Chunhyanjeon became the theatre's third premier in 1935.

In 1963, the South Korean government declared October 27, the same day when Korea Loyal Flight premiered at Dansungsa, to be the Korea Film Day. The declaration celebrated both the beginning of Korean film industry as well as the fact that Dansungsa, along with Woomikwan and Chosum Movie Theatre, the only theatre showing Korean movies during the colonial rule.

It has reopened in 2005 as a modern multiplex with seven screens.

Dansungsa is directly accessible from Jongno 3-ga Station of Seoul Subway lines one, three and five.

See also
 Cinema of Korea
 Korea under Japanese rule
 Daewoo Bus

References

Cinemas and movie theaters in Seoul
1907 establishments in Korea
Buildings and structures in Jongno District
20th-century architecture in South Korea